Xenosaurus fractus is a lizard found in Mexico.

References

Xenosauridae
Reptiles described in 2018
Reptiles of Mexico